Applied Economics Letters is a peer-reviewed academic journal covering applied economics. It was established in 1994 and is published 21 times per year by Routledge. It is a companion journal to Applied Economics. The editor-in-chief is Mark P. Taylor (Warwick Business School). According to the Journal Citation Reports, the journal has a 2017 impact factor of 0.504.

References

External links

Economics journals
Routledge academic journals
Publications established in 1994
Monthly journals
English-language journals